Acacia conspersa is a shrub or tree belonging to the genus Acacia and the subgenus Juliflorae that is native to northern Australia.

Description
It has brown to grey coloured bark that is rough and stringy or longitudinally fissured. It has terete branchlets that are densely villous. Like most species of Acacia it has phyllodes instead of true leaves. It blooms between April and October producing bright yellow flowers.

Taxonomy
the species was first formally described by the botanist Ferdinand von Mueller in 1859 as part of the work  Contributiones ad Acaciarum Australiae Cognitionem as published in the Journal of the Proceedings of the Linnean Society, Botany. It is easily confused with Acacia leptostachya.
The type specimen was collected by von Mueller in 1856 along the Gulf of Carpentaria.

Distribution
It is endemic to tropical areas in the Northern Territory where it is usually situated along creeks, in gullies or on sandstone hills where it is often found in colonies growing in alluvium or stony sandy soils as a part of shrubland, savannah grassland, ''Eucalyptus woodland or wet forest communities.

See also
List of Acacia species

References

conspersa
Flora of the Northern Territory
Taxa named by Ferdinand von Mueller
Plants described in 1859